Andrea Hradecká Šebová (born 4 September 1980) is a Slovak former professional tennis player.

Biography
Born in Partizánske, Šebová was ranked as high as five in the world as a junior.

Šebová spent most of her professional career on the ITF circuit and won eight titles, three in singles and five in doubles. She made her only WTA Tour main draw appearance at the 1999 Eurotel Slovak Indoor, where she and Stanislava Hrozenská qualified for the doubles.

At the 1999 Summer Universiade in Mallorca she won bronze medals in both the women's singles and doubles events.

Šebová, who left professional tennis in 2001, was married in 2004 to Radoslav Hradecký.

ITF finals

Singles (3–1)

Doubles (5–7)

References

External links
 
 

1980 births
Living people
Slovak female tennis players
Universiade medalists in tennis
Universiade bronze medalists for Slovakia
People from Partizánske
Sportspeople from the Trenčín Region
Medalists at the 1999 Summer Universiade
20th-century Slovak women